ATT Investments is a UCI Continental road bicycle racing team based in the Czech Republic. It was formed in 2011 and spent several years as a domestic team before being promoted to UCI Continental level in 2020.

Team roster

Major results 
2020
 National U23 Road Race Championships, Vojtěch Řepa
 Overall Tour of Małopolska, Vojtěch Řepa
2022
Stage 3 International Tour of Rhodes, Miká Heming
Stage 2 Carpathian Couriers Race, Miká Heming
Stage 2 Gemenc Grand Prix, Tomáš Bárta
2023
 Overall South Aegean Tour, Jakub Otruba

References

External links 
 
 

Cycling teams established in 2011
UCI Continental Teams (Europe)
Cycling teams based in the Czech Republic